Robert Naiman is a policy analyst, researcher, writer, and activist. He is formerly the policy director at Just Foreign Policy, and is the president of the board of directors at progressive news organization Truthout.  He has master's degrees in economics and mathematics from the University of Illinois.

Naiman writes is a frequent commentator on the Middle East.  He has worked as a policy analyst and researcher at the Center for Economic and Policy Research and the Public Citizen's Global Trade Watch. He has studied and worked in the Middle East, where he has  participated in actions "for the legitimate rights of the Palestinian people" and "against injustice," such as the 2011 attempt to break Israel's blockade of Gaza.

Naiman's writings and policy positions have received criticism from both supporters and opponents of Israeli policy towards the Palestinians.

References

External links
Center for Economic and Policy Research official website
Global Trade Watch official website

American activists
Year of birth missing (living people)
Living people